Sir (Cyril) James Stubblefield FRS (1901–1999) was a British geologist. Stubblefield was the president of the Geological Society of London from 1958 to 1960 and was the director of the Geological Survey of Great Britain from 1960 until 1966.

Early life
Stubblefield was born in Cambridge, the only son of a gardener and his wife. He gained a scholarship to The Perse School, Cambridge.

Education
After work as a junior factory chemist, Stubblefield moved to London to continue his education at evening classes at the South-Western Polytechnic (later Chelsea College). He gained a further scholarship to Imperial College, London, where he gained an ARCS and BSc in geology in 1923, with first class honours.

Sir Cyril James Stubblefield was a member of the Links Club of the City and Guilds College whilst at Imperial College.

Career
Stubblefield was appointed demonstrator in geology at Imperial and began research into the early Palaeozoic rocks of Shropshire, gaining his PhD in 1925 and also the Daniel Pidgeon fund of the Geological Society, with Oliver Bulman. In 1929 he published the Handbook of the Geology of Great Britain with J. W. Evans.

In 1928 Stubblefield joined the Geological Survey, at the Museum of Practical Geology, where he soon joined the palaeontology department. Here he worked on the Lower Palaeozoic fossils of Shrewsbury, the Carboniferous of the coalfields of south Wales and Kent, and other rocks in Cumberland.

Stubblefield became chief palaeontologist of the Geological Survey and Museum in 1947 and director in 1960, until retirement in 1966. Following reorganisation he became the first director of the Institute of Geological Sciences, later renamed the British Geological Survey.

Honours
Stubblefield was secretary of the Palaeontographical Society from 1934 to 1948, and subsequently president and compiler of the trilobite section of Zoological Record. He was president of the Geological Society (1958–60), receiving the Murchison Fund, the Bigsby medal (1945), and the Murchison Medal (1951). He received his London DSc in 1942, and was elected FRS in 1944. Stubblefield was knighted in the 1965 New Year Honours. He was president of the Sixth International Congress of Carboniferous Geology and Stratigraphy in 1967. A trilobite genus, Stubblefieldia, was named in his honour, as were many other species.

Private life
Stubblefield married Muriel Yakchee in 1932. They had two sons Rodney and Peter. He died in 1999 and was cremated in Ruislip.

References

External links
 British Geological Survey Archive Catalogue - C J Stubblefield

20th-century British geologists
British palaeontologists
1901 births
1999 deaths
Alumni of the Royal College of Science
Fellows of the Royal Society
People educated at The Perse School